Refresh may refer to:

Refresh rate, the rate at which a display illuminates
Meta refresh, an HTML tag
Memory refresh, reading and writing to the same area of computer memory
Refreshable braille display, a device for blind computer users
 USS Refresh (AM-287), an Admirable-class minesweeper built for the U.S. Navy during World War II
Refresh (EP), mini album by South Korean girl group CLC
Refresh FM, Christian radio station in South and Central Manchester, England
Refresh UK, a brewing business started in 2000